Hub is a city and capital of the Hub District in Balochistan, Pakistan. It is the 49th largest city of Pakistan by population according to the 2017 census, and is also Balochistan's fourth-largest city. Hub is an industrial city and its original name was Hub Chowki because once there was a police and customs check post (which is known as chowki in Urdu), named Nakahi. After the development of factories and many other industries, the town was renamed to Hub. Hub is one of the largest industrial centres of Balochistan, and because of its proximity to Karachi, it is becoming a Commuter town of the Karachi metropolitan area.

History 
The Kalmati Malik Principality of Hub-Malir Following the downfall of the Sultanate of Makran (mid 12th-early 14th century, A.D.)" the succeeding Baloch state of Kalmat (14th to mid-16th century) flourished in the coastal region extending from Pasni southward most probably as far as the Hub river.

Demographics
The majority of the population is Muslim, while there is small Hindu and Christian minorities. Increased commercialization in this area has led to many social, political and hygienic problems. The worsening state of roads and streets in the area has made everyday life difficult. Roads are too busy as the area serves as a hub between Balochistan and Karachi, that is one of the main reasons behind the lack of development in this area. Presence of political parties usually lead to deteriorating law and order situations, affecting the life and commerce in many ways and eventually leading to the decline of national economy.

Economy
Hub is economically one of the largest industrial cities in Balochistan. Hub is emerging as a commercial centre due to its proximity to Karachi. The Bazaars and markets are full with varieties of goods as well.There are numbers of cars and bike showroom the  cars showroom are Ahmed Motors Hub , Noorani Motors, GR Motors, New Jhalawan Motors and Bike showroom are Dubai Autos Hub Honda centre Al wali autos Iqra autos Karachi autos  

The Byco Petroleum's (now Cnergyico) refineries, Cadbury, DG Cement, Attock Cement, Ismail Industries Limited, Hubco Power Project, Bosicor Petrochemical Refineries (now Cnergyico) are located in Hub near Karachi.

Education
There are a number of primary (till class 5), secondary (till class 8) and high schools (till class 10/SSC) in Hub, including an English Language Center, Government Degree College, private college and public library each. However, the city lacks universities.

SSC schools
 Global Islamic Public School GIPS
 The Citizens Foundation (TCF) has nine campuses in Hub  
 Sadiq Public Secondary School has five campuse
 Grammar High School And secondary School 
 Special Public High School (Zehri Street Hub)
 Government School of Hub for Boys (Patrha Hub)
 Government School of Hub for girls (Adalat Road Hub)
 Ideal Public High School
 Muslim Public High School (Lasi Road Hub)
 Rind Academy High School Hub (Goth Mohammed Ali Rind. Mehmmood Abad Road Hub)
 Balochistan Kids Academy Hub
 National Cambridge High School (Allahabad town Hub)
 Crescent Public High School
 The Hub City School
 Balochistan School
 Oxford High School

Other schools
 The Excellence English Public School
 Brilliant Future Public School (secondary school)
The Future Reformers School Madina colony Hub
 Government School for Boys, Akram Colony (primary school)
Noor public high school (madina colony)
 Bright Future Grammar School (nazar chorangi hub)

Language Center
 School of Genesis Innovation (S.G.I)
 School of Intensive Teaching (S.I.T)
 The Hub English language Academy (THA)
 The informative academy hub TIA at lassi road hub Computer and technical training center registered from Balochistan board TTB

HSC colleges
 Government Degree College Hub

Private colleges
 The Professors Academy
sadiq Public College Hub

Undergraduate colleges
 Government Degree College Hub
 Balochistan College of Education

Public Library
S.G.I Public Library
 Hub Public Library
 S.I.T Public Library

Courses provided by colleges in Hub include FSC, FA, BSC and BA, however, these colleges lack education for IT, I.com, Engineering, Medical or ICS. Students from Hub have to transfer to Karachi, Uthal or other cities to proceed to university-level education.

See also 

 Sonmiani
 Somiani Spaceport
 Sonmiani Beach
 Lasbela District
 Hub, Balochistan
 Hub District
 Hub Tehsil
 Hub River 
 Hub Industrial & Trading Estate

References

Tehsils of Balochistan, Pakistan
Populated places in Hub District
Populated places in Balochistan, Pakistan